Porjanpur railway station, located in the Indian state of Odisha, serves Porjanpur, Palasponga and Jhumpura in Kendujhar district. It is on the Padapahar–Jakhapura branch line.

Three passenger trains pass through Porjanpur railway station.

Railway stations in Kendujhar district